Kote Venkataramana Temple   is a Hindu temple in Krishnarajendra Road, Bangalore, India dedicated to the god Venkateshwara. The temple was built in 1689 in Dravidian and Vijayanagara style by King Chikka Devaraja Wodeyar, then ruler of Mysore.

Temple plan
The late 17th century Venkataramana temple is located near the old fort ("fort" is kote in Kannada language) adjacent to what was once the residence of Mysore Wodeyar royal family, and later became the palace of Tipu Sultan, a later ruler of the Mysore Kingdom.

The temple consists of a sanctum (garbhagriha) which is connected to a central hall (mantapa) by a vestibule. The walls of the sanctum and vestibule (antechamber) are plain but for a row of deity sculptures in frieze at the base. On the whole the temple exudes modest decorative work and follows the general plan used in the temples within the palace complex in Mysore. The hall ceiling is  supported by pillars that have "clusters of colonettes" alternating with yalis (mythical beasts from Hindu legend) in all four directions. This appears on each of the central columns.

The main festival celebrated here is Vaikuntha Ekadashi when thousands of devotees throng the temple.

This temple provided the setting for the treasure hunt in the book Riddle of the Seventh Stone

Gallery

References

Notes

17th-century Hindu temples
Hindu temples in Bangalore
Vishnu temples
1689 establishments in India